Bruce Bugbee is an American scientist. His work includes research into space farming with NASA and at Utah State University, where he is the Director of the Crop Physiology Laboratory.

Academic career
Bugbee is the Director of the Crop Physiology Laboratory at Utah State University in their Plants, Soils & Climate Department. He is also the President of Apogee Instruments. He was named a Fellow of the American Society of Agronomy in 2018. Bugbee has also provided TEDx Talks on his work, and has been awarded the Utah Governor’s Medal for Science and Technology.

Research
Bruce Bugbee has studied recirculating hydroponics since the 1980s and has used the principles to create self-sustaining ecosystems. He has focused his study of hydroponics partially on use for long-term space missions. In his work on developing crop sustainability for long-term space missions, Bugbee additionally focuses on nutritional needs for space explorers, determining how many different crops would be needed to sustain life. He also states that gravity is needed in order for plants to grow properly.

Bugbee has worked with NASA in his research on regenerative systems and the effects of microgravity on plants. He first began working with NASA upon his arrival at Utah State University in 1981. He was a part of the team to first grow crops on the International Space Station. This work has expanded to include lettuce and radishes. Bugbee’s work with NASA also includes the development of crop growing systems for future life on the Moon and Mars in addition to in orbit or in space shuttles.

When the film The Martian was released in 2015, Bugbee supported the idea that crops could be grown on Mars using similar methods to those used in the book and movie so long as proper composting methods were utilized. He has worked on projects for Mars farming including the use of fiber optics for indoor lighting. As a part of this research, Bugbee was involved in the 2017 creation of the $15 million Space Technology Research Institute "Center for the Utilization of Biological Engineering in Space."

Bugbee has been a critic of the use of indoor farming as a means of solving food shortages, citing concerns about the large amount of electricity needed to provide light for photosynthesis. His work in this area has included studies into the efficacy of LED lights for indoor growing. In 2018, he was a part of a project on reducing the energy costs of indoor farming that received a $5 million grant from the U.S. Department of Agriculture National Institute for Food and Agriculture Specialty Crop Research Initiative.

Personal life
Bugbee is married to his wife Diana West and lives in the Crockett House (Logan, Utah), a home registered in the National Register of Historic Places, where the two have developed a garden that is used for community events and parties. Co-authored with his wife, he has published a book that covers photography from each of the annual gardens since 1982.

References

Living people
Utah State University faculty
American botanists
NASA people
Year of birth missing (living people)